Tephritis ozaslani is a species of tephritid or fruit flies in the genus Tephritis of the family Tephritidae.

Distribution
Turkey.

References

Tephritinae
Insects described in 2012
Diptera of Europe